Jonathan Emmanuel Orozco Domínguez (born 12 May 1986) is a Mexican professional footballer who plays as a goalkeeper for Liga MX club Tijuana.

Orozco began his career with Monterrey making his debut in the Apertura 2005 tournament and became the starting goalkeeper in 2008, winning two league titles and three CONCACAF Champions League tournaments before transferring to Santos Laguna in 2016, helping them win the Clausura 2018 league title. In 2020 he was transferred to Tijuana.

He made his international debut for Mexico on February 24, 2010, in a friendly against Bolivia and was the starting goalkeeper in the 2013 CONCACAF Gold Cup, as a backup he has won the 2011, 2015 and 2019 editions of the tournament.

Club career
Born in Monterrey, Nuevo León, Orozco began his career in 2005 with Cobras de Ciudad Juárez who at the time were the filial team for Monterrey. After playing part of the Apertura 2005 tournament with C.F. Monterrey 1a A, he was called up to the first team. He made his professional debut on August 13, 2005, a 1–0 win over Atlas, earning a clean sheet in his first career start. Jonathan Orozco was also part of the squad that won the Apertura 2009 with Monterrey.

Orozco won his second championship with Monterrey in the Apertura 2010. He played the finale with Santos Laguna, winning 3-0 (5-3 aggregate) and giving Monterrey their fourth FMF championship.

In January 2017, he moved to Santos Laguna on a free transfer, where he won the Clausura 2018.

On 21 May 2020, Orozco tested positive for COVID-19 during the pandemic, but later recovered and transferred to Club Tijuana the next month.

International career
Orozco was first called up to the senior national team on February 18, 2010. He played all 90 minutes against Bolivia and earned a clean sheet. He was on the Mexico roster for the 2011 Gold Cup, the 2013 Gold Cup, the 2015 Gold Cup, the 2015 CONCACAF Cup, and the 2019 Gold Cup.

Career statistics

International

Honours
Monterrey
Mexican Primera División: Apertura 2009, Apertura 2010
InterLiga: 2010
CONCACAF Champions League: 2010–11, 2011–12, 2012–13

Santos Laguna
Liga MX: Clausura 2018

Mexico
CONCACAF Gold Cup: 2011, 2015, 2019
CONCACAF Cup: 2015

Individual
Mexican Primera División Balón de Oro Goalkeeper of the tournament: Apertura 2009, Clausura 2011

References

External links

 
 
 

1986 births
Living people
Footballers from Nuevo León
Mexico international footballers
Association football goalkeepers
C.F. Monterrey players
CONCACAF Gold Cup-winning players
Sportspeople from Monterrey
Liga MX players
2011 CONCACAF Gold Cup players
2013 CONCACAF Gold Cup players
2015 CONCACAF Gold Cup players
2019 CONCACAF Gold Cup players
2021 CONCACAF Gold Cup players
Mexican footballers